Eric Butorac and Bruno Soares were the defending champions but Butorac decided not to participate this year.
Soares played alongside Alexander Peya and successfully defended the title, defeating František Čermák and Michal Mertiňák in the final 6–7(5–7), 6–2, [10–7].

Seeds

Draw

Draw

References
 Main Draw

Brasil Open - Doubles
2013 Brasil Open